Bolitoglossa rostrata is a species of salamander in the family Plethodontidae.
It is found in Guatemala and Mexico.
Its natural habitats are subtropical or tropical moist montane forests and heavily degraded former forest.
It is threatened by habitat loss.

References

Sources
 Acevedo, M. & Wake, D. 2004.  Bolitoglossa rostrata.   2012 IUCN Red List of Threatened Species.   Downloaded on 16 October 2012.

Bolitoglossa
Taxonomy articles created by Polbot
Amphibians described in 1883